Annabel Takes a Tour is a 1938 comedy directed by Lew Landers, starring Lucille Ball and Jack Oakie. Annabel (Lucille Ball) is on a promotional tour and, as a publicity stunt, leaks a story that she is having a romantic fling with a famous romance novelist. The film is a sequel to The Affairs of Annabel.

Plot
Frustrated at being upstaged in the press by a colleague who's making headlines with her aristocratic fiancé, movie star Annabel Allison insists that studio chief Howard Webb rehire dangerously resourceful publicist Lanny Morgan. Allison, Morgan, Josephine, and Poochy depart by train for Chicago on a public-appearance tour in conjunction with the premiere of Allison's latest film. Morgan accidentally sends Allison through a trap door as she addresses the Chicago audience, and he attempts unsuccessfully to capitalize on the mishap for PR purposes by exaggerating Allison's injuries. While recuperating in her hotel, Allison learns that author Ronald River-Clyde is staying down the hall, and she realizes his aristocratic title could solve her publicity problems. She and Morgan work independently to manipulate River-Clyde into a high-profile date with Annabel; but when Annabel gets so carried away with her fantasies of accommodating the viscount's presumed loftiness that she decides to shun publicity, she finds herself at cross purposes with her press agent. While Annabel pursues a quiet relationship with River-Clyde, Lanny keeps trying to push them into the spotlight. Meanwhile, an initially baffled River-Clyde has been persuaded by his publisher to use Annabel for his own publicity, so he does not resist Annabel's romantic pursuit of him. When Annabel goes so far as to give up her career, Morgan tries to break up the romance, for which purpose he engages a hotel manicurist with Hollywood ambitions to confront River-Clyde onstage at Annabel's rescheduled premiere, claiming to be an abandoned wife. The manicurist is a dolt and the stunt does not come off; but, immediately thereafter, River-Clyde is confronted by his real wife and children, who have traveled from England to intervene, with legal assistance. Annabel and her entourage escape the process server by boarding a train. When Morgan discovers that River-Clyde and his family are also on the train, he disconnects the caboose so that Annabel and her party drift free.

Cast
 Jack Oakie as Lanny Morgan
 Lucille Ball as  Annabel Allison
 Ruth Donnelly as Josephine 'Jo'
 Bradley Page as Howard Webb, Chief of Wonder Pictures
 Ralph Forbes as Viscount Ronald River-Clyde
 Frances Mercer as Natalie Preston
 Donald MacBride as Thompson, RR Conductor
 Alice White as Marcella, Hotel Manicurist
 Chester Clute as Pitcarin, Rodney-Marlborough Hotel Manager
 Jean Rouverol as Laura Hampton
 Clare Verdera as Viscountess River-Clyde
 Edward Gargan as Longshoreman at dance
 Pepito Pérez as Poochy the Accordion Player
 Cecil Kellaway as Strothers (uncredited)

References

External links
 
 
 
 Annabel Takes a Tour at Lucille Ball

1938 films
American comedy films
Films directed by Lew Landers
1938 comedy films
American black-and-white films
RKO Pictures films
Publicity stunts in fiction
Films about filmmaking
1930s American films